D. Vivian Lee Bowden (February 23, 1943 – January 9, 2017) was a science journalist who discovered the unpublished drawings of early French botanist Antoine Nicolas Duchesne and authored an influential history of the garden strawberry. Her extensive research conducted in both Europe and America has been widely cited.


Life and education 
D. Vivian Lee was born in Washington DC, on February 23, 1943. She received her BS from Stanford University and her MS from Columbia School of Journalism. Before marriage, she worked as a science journalist for Life magazine. She married Douglas M. Bowden in New York, NY in 1966. Lee Bowden resumed her education after raising a family, and earned a Master of Divinity from the Pacific School of Religion in Berkeley, California.

Research 
Lee conducted extensive research in her work on the historical background of the strawberry. At the behest of Henry A. Wallace, Lee visited France, Germany and the Netherlands in summer 1962 to research the history of the garden strawberry. On July 10, 1962, she discovered in the Paris Jardin des Plantes a collection of 73 original drawings of Fragaria by Antoine Nicolas Duchesne. Duchesne prepared these for use in his monumental book describing strawberry history, taxonomy, and cultivation. Due to budgetary constraints, the drawings were not published, and were overlooked for almost 200 years. The drawings provide significant historical context for the pioneering work of Duchesne. Lee made her discovery at age 19, the same age that Duchesne published his book.

Lee presented her findings in an invited talk at a national meeting, and wrote four chapters on the history of strawberry for the positively reviewed and widely cited book The Strawberry: History, Breeding and Physiology. Her contribution is clearly acknowledged in the preface, but not on the title page, and most subsequent authors have misattributed the chapters to George M. Darrow, a USDA strawberry geneticist. In his discussion of the nomenclature of the garden strawberry, taxonomist M. Guédès alludes to the thoroughness of her scholarship, and properly cites her contribution.

References 

1943 births
2017 deaths
Journalists from Washington, D.C.
Columbia University Graduate School of Journalism alumni
Pacific School of Religion alumni
Stanford University alumni
Science journalists
American science journalists
American women journalists
21st-century American women